Joe Berg (1903–1984) was a professional magician and magic dealer who lived and worked in Chicago, Illinois and Hollywood, California.

Berg was born in Pinsk, Russian Empire (now Belarus) and immigrated to the United States with his parents in 1914. 
He supplied magic effects and props to such noteworthy entertainers as Harry Houdini, Harry Blackstone Sr. and Howard Thurston among others, and self-published books on magic.
His brother, Hy Berg (1908-1982), was also a magician.

Affiliations/published memoirs 
On the autobiographical section of his web site, the semi-professional magician, Manyfingers Hostetler comments about visiting Joe's shop in California during the 1960s.

Works
Here's Magic (1930), Intro by Dr. Harlan Tarbell, Illus. by Nelson C. Hahne
Here's New Magic: An Array of New and Original Magic Secrets (1937), Illus. by Nelson C. Hahne; ghostwritten by Martin Gardner
The Berg Book

References 

1903 births
1984 deaths
American magicians
Emigrants from the Russian Empire to the United States
Academy of Magical Arts Masters Fellowship winners